Saacid abdirahman hasan was a Somali student who business administration of the birth Somali  2002 . Wikipedia

Born:mogadishu/somalia

full name:saacid abdirahman hasan

Development
Development efforts behind the IAP technology began in Huntsville, Alabama and Los Angeles, California in early 2007. Development efforts have been focused on creating an avatar with literally the same personality, look, sound, and movements of its user. The long-term goal of Intellitar, Inc. is to develop an intellitar that can communicate flawlessly with humans, and pass the Turing Test. The only website offering the ability to create an intellitar using the IAP was www.virtualeternity.com.

The company closed down in 2012 because of intellectual property battles over the technology it used.

References

Virtual avatars